Bald Mountain is a mountain summit in the West Elk Mountains range of the Rocky Mountains of North America.

Mountain

See also

Peaks of the West Elk Wilderness on ListsOfJohn.com.
List of Colorado mountain ranges

References

External links

West Elk Mountains
Mountains of Gunnison County, Colorado
Gunnison National Forest
Mountains of Colorado
North American 3000 m summits